Beresford Place is a street in Dublin, Ireland originally laid out as a crescent surrounding The Custom House in 1792.

History
Beresford Place was developed in 1792 as a continuous crescent which was aligned to the axis of the central dome of the Custom House. Along with the Custom House and the old Custom House Dock, the houses were also originally designed by James Gandon. The main crescent was developed specifically for John Claudius Beresford.

At that time it was located at the edge of the city, with Marlborough Bowling Green and Pleasure Gardens and Tyrone House to the north and Mabbot Street to the south. Later a corresponding crescent was intended to be developed by Luke Gardiner at the other end of Gardiner Street near the Mater Hospital however these plans never reached construction stage owing to the economic downturn following the Acts of Union.

The crescent was bisected in 1888-1889 by the construction of the Loop Line railway, and since further impacted by the destruction of some buildings during the Irish War of Independence and in the 1970s by the development of the new headquarters of Irish Life at the Irish Life Centre. Five houses between two radial streets, Gardiner Street and Store Street, now remain, with the houses west of Gardiner Street having been demolished.

The site now occupied by Busáras was originally a further terraced crescent of store houses which were part of the Custom House Docks and gave Store Street its name.

The extant Gandon houses are 4 storeys over basements, built with red brick with rusticated granite ground floors. The end houses are both on an irregular trapezoidal plan, and are entered from Gardiner Street and Store Street respectively. They are among very few specifically unified formal terraces from the 18th century and the only surviving example.

There were tentative plans to demolish and redevelop the site in the 1960s, with a design by Michael Scott.

In 1996 a statue of James Connolly by Éamonn O'Doherty was erected on the street just west of the Custom House, facing onto Liberty Hall. At the other end of the street, at the junction of Beresford Place, Amiens Street, and Memorial Road is the sculpture Universal Links on Human Rights by Tony O'Malley, erected in 1995.

See also
List of streets and squares in Dublin

References 

Sources

 
 

Streets in Dublin (city)
Georgian architecture in Ireland
Crescents (architecture)